Josiesley Ferreira Rosa, best known as Ferreira (born February 21, 1979 in Uberlândia, Minas Gerais State) is a Brazilian football striker.

Career
Born in Uberlândia, Minas Gerais State, during his early career he played with several clubs in Brazil: Uberlândia, Goiás, Atlético Mineiro, Ateneu and Mamoré.

In summer 2001 he moved to Portugal where, until 2006, he represented several Portuguese Liga clubs: Farense, Vitória Guimarães, Beira-Mar, Gil Vicente, CD Nacional and União Leiria.

In 2006, he signed with Cruzeiro playing in the Campeonato Brasileiro Série A. He  played afterwards with Ipatinga (Serie B) and Náutico (Serie A) before returning to Portuguese top league club União Leiria in 2008.

After that short return to Portugal, his next destination was Ulsan Hyundai Horang-i in the South Korean K-League. Afterwards he had a spell with Ipatinga, who he had helped the year before to get the promotion to the Brazilian Serie A, before joining former European champions Red Star Belgrade playing in the Serbian SuperLiga.

In 2009, he was back to Brazil playing Náutico in the Serie A then moving to Mirassol in 2010. In 2011, he moved abroad again, this time signing with Iran Pro League side Naft Tehran.

Achievements
Rosa was runner-up top scorer of the Campeonato Mineiro 2001, with nine goals and third top scorer of the Portuguese Liga 2003-04, with 14 goals.

References

External links
 
 Ferreira at Srbijafudbal  
 
 

1979 births
Living people
Brazilian footballers
Brazilian expatriate footballers
Association football forwards
Uberlândia Esporte Clube players
Goiás Esporte Clube players
Clube Atlético Mineiro players
Cruzeiro Esporte Clube players
Ipatinga Futebol Clube players
Clube Náutico Capibaribe players
Mirassol Futebol Clube players
S.C. Farense players
S.C. Beira-Mar players
Vitória S.C. players
Gil Vicente F.C. players
U.D. Leiria players
C.D. Nacional players
Primeira Liga players
Expatriate footballers in Portugal
Ulsan Hyundai FC players
K League 1 players
Expatriate footballers in South Korea
Red Star Belgrade footballers
Serbian SuperLiga players
Expatriate footballers in Serbia
Brazilian expatriate sportspeople in South Korea
Expatriate footballers in Iran
Naft Tehran F.C. players
Persian Gulf Pro League players